Brian Keith Manning (born April 22, 1975) is a former wide receiver in the National Football League who played for the Miami Dolphins and the Green Bay Packers.  Manning played collegiate ball for the Stanford University before being drafted by the Dolphins in the 6th round of the 1997 NFL Draft.  He played professionally for 2 seasons from 1997 to 1998.

References

1975 births
Green Bay Packers players
Miami Dolphins players
Living people
American football wide receivers
Stanford Cardinal football players